Emma Smith is Professor of Shakespeare Studies at the University of Oxford, and a Fellow of Hertford College. She has published and lectured widely on Shakespeare and on other early modern dramatists, and worked with numerous theatre companies. Her lectures are available as podcasts Not Shakespeare: Elizabethan and Jacobean Popular Theatre and Approaching Shakespeare.

Life and career
Smith was educated at Abbey Grange school in Leeds and did her undergraduate degree at Somerville College, Oxford, from 1988 to 1991. She was a Prize Fellow at All Souls College Oxford.  As part of her work on Shakespeare’s First Folio, Smith worked with conservators, digital specialists and crowd-sourced funding on a Bodleian Library project to digitise a copy of the book. In 2016, she authenticated a new copy of Shakespeare's First Folio found at Mount Stuart House on the Isle of Bute.

With Laurie Maguire of Oxford University she published a new argument in 2012 that Shakespeare's play All's Well that Ends Well was a collaboration with Thomas Middleton. The New Oxford Shakespeare edition of 2016, edited by Bourus et al, was the first printed edition of the play to accept this joint attribution. Another article with Laurie Maguire won the 2014 Hoffman Prize. She was a script advisor to Josie Rourke’s 2018 film Mary Queen of Scots. She edits the Cambridge University Press journal Shakespeare Survey.

Smith published This Is Shakespeare in 2019. The book was published as a guide to Shakespeare's plays. It extends from her lectures for Oxford undergraduates, which were also used as the basis for her Approaching Shakespeare podcast, where she discusses 20 of Shakespeare's plays in chronological order. She says she wanted the book "to give a sense of Shakespeare’s range across his career" but also "to keep the individual chapters self-contained, so that you could read one before going to the theatre."

Bibliography

Selected publications 
This Is Shakespeare (Pelican, 2019)
Shakespeare’s First Folio: Four Centuries of an Iconic Book, (Oxford University Press, 2016)
The Making of Shakespeare's First Folio, (Bodleian Publishing, 2015)
The Elizabethan Top Ten: Defining Print Popularity in Early Modern England. Eds. Andy Kesson and Emma Smith (Ashgate Publishing, Ltd., 2013) 
Five Revenge Tragedies: The Spanish Tragedy, Hamlet, Antonio's Revenge, The Tragedy of Hoffman, The Revenger's Tragedy (Penguin UK, 2012) 
The Cambridge Shakespeare Guide (Cambridge University Press, 2012)
The Cambridge Introduction to Shakespeare (Cambridge University Press, 2007) 
Shakespeare's Comedies: a Guide to Criticism (Blackwell Guides to Criticism, 2003)
Shakespeare's Histories: a Guide to Criticism (Blackwell Guides to Criticism, 2003)
Shakespeare's Tragedies: a Guide to Criticism (Blackwell Guides to Criticism, 2003)
Shakespeare in Production: Henry V (2000)
Thomas Kyd: The Spanish Tragedie (ed. 1998)
Women on the Early Modern Stage: A Woman Killed with Kindness, The Tamer Tamed, The Duchess of Malfi, The Witch of Edmonton (2014)
Portable Magic: A History of Books and their Readers (Penguin, 2022)

References

External links 
 Emma Smith's website
 Bodleian Library's First Folio
 Hertford College, Oxford
 Oxford University Department for Continuing Education
 Literature Compass

Oxford podcasts 
Approaching Shakespeare
Not Shakespeare: Elizabethan and Jacobean Popular Theatre

Fellows of Hertford College, Oxford
Fellows of Somerville College, Oxford
Alumni of Somerville College, Oxford
Living people
Shakespearean scholars
Year of birth missing (living people)